Alcohol consumption by youth in the United States of America, also known as underage drinking, is an umbrella term for alcohol consumption by individuals under the age of 18 in the country.

Although the minimum legal age to purchase alcohol is 21 in all states and most territories (see National Minimum Drinking Age Act), the legal details for consumption vary greatly. While a few states completely ban alcohol usage for people under 18, the majority have exceptions that permit consumption.

Underage drinking has become an activity primarily done behind closed doors. Typically, underage drinkers hide their alcohol consumption by drinking quickly before they go out, which is often referred to as pregaming or pre-partying. Brittany Levine explained in her article "Pre-Gaming" in USA Today that "of all drinking events involving pre-partying, 80% involved additional drinking afterward."  Those who oppose a complete ban on underage drinking argue that it is important that minors be introduced to alcohol in a controlled environment, so that supervision and guidance might occur instead of experimentation. Some parents are willing to provide alcohol for their children if they drink it in a controlled environment. Furnishing alcohol to one's own children is permitted in 31 states, while it's illegal to do so for other people's children in all fifty states. Social host ordinances have been enacted in a number of jurisdictions to attempt to limit the parties where adults may permit minors to drink. Social host laws or ordinances have proliferated in the last ten years because it has been too difficult for law enforcement to prove which adults furnished or served alcohol to minors in their own home, so it permits them to cite or arrest the adult who has control of the premises. Due to the difficulty in proving these cases, some states make this an affirmative defense that the defendant must prove consumption was legally permissible.

Drinking age
Most states decided on the age 21 after prohibition, but the 26th amendment allowed individuals 18 and older to vote and serve in Vietnam, so several states lowered the drinking age as well. However, President Ronald Reagan, who was influenced by groups such as Mothers Against Drunk Driving (MADD) and Remove Intoxicated Drivers (RID), decided to federally enforce a 21+ drinking age by signing the National Minimum Drinking Age Act of 1984. He believed that doing so would decrease the number of accidents related to drunk driving, because he said that states with a drinking age of 21+ did not have as many drunk driving accidents. Reagan said that although he wished states would create their own legislation to increase the drinking age, a federal law had to be implemented to avoid blood borders, or teenagers driving to the nearest state with a lower drinking age.   Reagan threatened states with withholding 5% of federal funding for highways if they did not comply with increasing the drinking age to 21.

In 2007, the drinking age debate in the United States was renewed when Choose Responsibility began promoting the lowering of the drinking age coupled with education and rules to persuade people to drink responsibly before they are of legal age. Before one is eligible to buy, possess and consume alcohol, an alcohol education class must be completed in its entirety and each teen must pass a final examination before licensing can occur. If a teen has any alcohol-related law violations before they turn 18, they will have a minimum of one year per violation before they are eligible to be licensed.

In 2008, McCardell and the presidents of over 100 U.S. colleges and universities launched the Amethyst Initiative, a campaign to debate the effectiveness of present alcohol laws. In 2008, Gallup reported that 77% of the population over 18 oppose the 18-year drinking age. As it stands, any state that lowers its alcohol purchase or possession age would lose five percent of its federal highway funding. This could range from a $6 million–150 million loss for any single state.

Prevention programs
According to Frances M. Harding of the Substance Abuse and Mental Health Services Administration's (SAMHSA) Center for Substance Abuse Prevention, "Our target is to change social norms."

Brief Alcohol Screening and Intervention for College Students
The Brief Alcohol Screening and Intervention for College Students (BASICS) program consists of a brief survey given to students to help them assess their alcohol usage against other students. It also consists of one or two counseling sessions granted to the students to provide support and not be confrontational regarding their alcohol use.

"Talk. They Hear You"
The Substance Abuse and Mental Health Services Administration created the "Talk. They Hear You" campaign that involved a mobile app to assist parents with having conversations about alcohol usage to their children.

Motivations
	To summarize the motivations for underage drinking, cultural norms allow underage drinking while social pressures facilitate them. Although the legal drinking age is set at 21, drinking at age 18 or upon entrance into college is the culturally accepted limit. This cultural permission is the primary reason many college students ignore laws concerning drinking. In addition to cultural motivations, students are socially expected to drink. Often if not always, social gatherings are centered on drinking. Furthermore, besides feeling the need to drink in order to be accepted, alcohol intoxication provides students who may be shy or feel out of their element with enough liquid courage to enjoy themselves. Another major factor is a teen living in a household where drinking is common. Some parents even provide alcohol for their children . One study from 2005 showed that twenty six percent of adults think underage drinking is okay if an adult is present. 

Those that are for lowering the drinking age generally argue that the moderate consumption of alcohol frequently as a complement to a meal or drink with friends is preferable to and healthier than the binge drinking habits more often associated with dry countries such as the United States. These opinions generally lead to the argument that it is far more effective and beneficial for laws to monitor, limit, and guide healthy drinking habits rather than to outright ban it. Furthermore, it is argued that alcohol misuse occurs—at least in part—as a result of the stringent drinking laws. It is said that if a drinking age wasn't strictly enforced and people below the age of 18 had opportunities to learn how to drink responsibility before college, fewer teenagers would misuse alcohol. Dwight B. Heath, a Professor at Brown points out the ‘forbidden fruit’ syndrome that is created when the drinking age is so high. In contrast to countries with low drinking ages. "Alcohol has no mystique. It's no big deal.” Many of these proponents also argue that instead of there being a strict age limit, laws should be more gradual with suggestions such as having to take a test to get licensed to drink or implementing laws such as those in Europe that limit the type of alcohols or the setting under which they may be consumed.
	
For those who argue for maintaining and even strengthening current drinking laws, however, citing past examples, generally argue that injuries and deaths related to drinking are bad enough presently. They also argue that initiatives to implement gradual drinking laws or educational programs are optimistic and unrealistic. Furthermore, they propose that drinking and driving related problems are rampant enough among those who are not legally of age and that lowering the drinking age would only enable these habits further, causing an even higher volume of alcohol-related problems.

Statistics

Rates

Although the incidence of underage drinking is still significant, government, university and national statistics have confirmed that alcohol use and binge drinking among high school students has declined steadily over the past three decades, and continues to decline annually. According to a United States Substance Abuse and Mental Health Services Administration study involving 30,000 youths aged 12 to 20 years old, between 2002 and 2013 the percentage of underage drinkers declined from 28.8% to 22.7%. Underage binge drinkers decreased 19.3% to 14.2%. A December 2014, study performed by the University of Michigan also found that 75% of senior high school students disapproved of drinking excessively on the weekends. Alcohol still proved to be the favored substance among American youths however, with tobacco and illicit drugs following in rank.

Alcohol access
A survey of over 6000 teenagers revealed (1):

 Teenagers and young adults typically get their alcohol from persons 21 or older. The second most common source for high school students is someone else under age 21, and the third most common source for 18- to 20-year-old adults is buying it from a store, bar or restaurant (despite the fact that such sales are against the law).
 In the 12th grade, boys were more likely than girls to buy alcohol from a store, bar or restaurant.
 Teenagers with higher weekly incomes are more likely to buy alcohol from a store, bar or restaurant.
 It is easy to get alcohol at a party and from siblings or others 21 or older.
How easy is it for youth to buy alcohol?

When young females attempted to buy beer without an ID at liquor, grocery or convenience stores, 47–52% of the attempts, beer was sold (1, 2) and nearly 80% of all the stores sold beer to the buyers at least once in three attempts; nearly 25% sold beer all three times.(1)
When young females attempted to buy beer without an ID at bars or restaurants, 50% of the attempts resulted in a sale to the buyer.(2)
When young males and females attempted to buy beer without an ID at community festivals, 50% of the attempts resulted in a sale to the buyer.(3)

See also
 Alcohol advertising on college campuses
 California Department of Alcoholic Beverage Control
 Legal drinking age controversy in the United States

References

External links
 
 California Department of Alcoholic Beverage Control Shoulder Tap Program
 Choose Responsibility
 The Century Council: Learn the Facts
 MADD Online: Stats & Resources
 National Youth Rights Association
 SAMHSA's "Talk. They Hear You." page
 "#1 Party School". This American Life, December 18, 2009. This American Life examines the party (and therefore drinking) culture at Penn State.
 Alcohol, Marijuana, and Tobacco Use Patterns among Youth in Canada

Alcohol in the United States
Drinking culture
Youth in the United States